Australia competed at the 1900 Summer Olympics in Paris, France. Most Olympic historians keep Australian records at early Olympics separate from those of the United Kingdom despite Australia's lack of independence at the time.

Australia was represented by two athletes, both of whom won a medal in each event in which they competed. Frederick Lane won two gold medals in swimming and Stan Rowley won a gold medal (as part of a mixed team with Great Britain) and three bronze medals in athletics.

Medalists

Medals awarded to participants of mixed-NOC teams are represented in italics. These medals are not counted towards the individual NOC medal tally.

Swimming

One swimmer, (Frederick Lane) represented Australia in 1900. It was the nation's debut appearance in the sport. Lane won the 200 metre freestyle and obstacle races, both on the same day. He did not receive gold medals, but instead received bronze sculptures of a horse and peasant girl respectively. He was also the favourite for the 100 metre freestyle, but this event was cancelled.

Athletics

Rowley was Australia's only competitor in athletics. It was Australia's second appearance in the sport. He entered the three sprint events, taking the bronze medal in each of the three. Rowley also joined the Great Britain team in the 5-man team race, as the British squad had only 4 members. The 5 kilometres of the race was much further than Rowley was used to racing. After the first lap of the track, he injured his foot and began to walk. When the last of the other nine competitors (the United Kingdom and France were the only nations to send teams) finished, Rowley was still 1500 metres from the finish; officials allowed him to retire and claim 10th place at that point.

Rowley's three individual medals put him, and Australia, in ninth place on the athletics leaderboard.

Non-Olympic events

Shooting

Donald Mackintosh was a professional shooter from Melbourne. He was travelling through Europe competing in a series of traditional competitions. He won the live game shooting (Prix Centenaire de Paris) with 22 consecutive kills of live pigeons, one more than Marquis de Villancosa of Spain. He finished in the joint third position alongside Crittenden Robinson of the United States in the live pigeon shooting (Grand Prix d'Exposition) with 18, behind the winner Leon de Lunden, who scored 21. Mackintosh' status has often been confused, as some historians were under the impression that game-shooting was an archery contest.  The International Olympic Committee does not consider either event Olympic.

References

 
 De Wael, Herman. Herman's Full Olympians: "1900 Olympians from Australia". Accessed 11 March 2006.
 

Nations at the 1900 Summer Olympics
1900
Olympics